My Saint Helena Island is the unofficial regional anthem of Saint Helena. It was written by Dave Mitchell in 1975, after persuasion from the inhabitants of Saint Helena. As a British Overseas Territory, the national anthem is "God Save the King".

Lyrics

References

Saint Helenian culture
African anthems
1975 songs
British anthems